Dmitriyevka is a rural locality (a selo) in Starooskolsky District, Belgorod Oblast, Russia. The population was 719 as of 2010. There are 19 streets.

Geography 
Dmitriyevka is located 27 km southeast of Stary Oskol (the district's administrative centre) by road. Chuzhikovo is the nearest rural locality.

References 

Rural localities in Starooskolsky District